William "Bil" Clemons, Jr. is an American structural biologist and Professor of Biochemistry at Caltech. He is best known for his work solving the atomic structure of the ribosome with dissertation advisor, Nobel Prize winner in Chemistry, Venki Ramakrishnan. He is also known for his work on the structure and function of proteins involved in membrane translocation and docking of proteins, including the membrane protein translocation channel SecY, chaperones involved in the targeting of tail-anchored membrane proteins in the Get pathway, and signal recognition proteins of the Twin-arginine translocation pathway. He was elected a member of the National Academy of Sciences in 2022.

Education 
Clemons received a B.S. in Biochemistry from Virginia Polytechnic Institute and State University in 1995. In 2000, he received his Ph.D. in Biochemistry from the University of Utah while working jointly with the Laboratory of Molecular Biology, in Cambridge, England under the advisement of Venki Ramakrishnan. He then spent four years, from 2001 to 2005, as a postdoctoral fellow under Professor Tom Rapoport in the Department of Cell Biology at Harvard Medical School.

Career 
In January 2006, Clemons began as an assistant professor in the Chemistry and Chemical Engineering Division at the California Institute of Technology. In 2013, Clemons became professor of Biochemistry. He has also held a Visiting Professor appointment from 2018-2019 at the Institute of Organic Chemistry & Biochemistry, Prague, Czech Republic.

Diversity and Inclusion 
As a member of the President's Diversity Council at Caltech, Clemons mentors and advocates for diversity and enrollment of minority students in STEM education. He has spoken on the intersection of science and diversity as an invited speaker.

Honors and awards 
 2018 Virginia Tech Biochemistry - Distinguished Alumni
 2017 Dr. Fred Shair Award for Programming Diversity
 2011-2016 NIH Pioneer Award
 2005-2010 Burroughs Wellcome Career Award in the Biomedical Sciences

References

External links 
 https://www.bwfund.org/newsroom/awardee-profiles/awardee-profile-bil-clemons
 https://sbgrid.org/software/tale/predicting-success
 https://www.biochem.vt.edu/people/Featured_Alumni.html
 https://science.oregonstate.edu/IMPACT/2018/02/distinguished-biochemist-speak-diversity-science-higher-education
 

Year of birth missing (living people)
Living people
California Institute of Technology faculty
Structural biologists
University of Utah alumni
Virginia Tech alumni
Members of the United States National Academy of Sciences